Balatonfüred is a resort town in Veszprém county, in Hungary, with a population of 13,000, situated on the northern shore of Lake Balaton. It is considered to be the capital of the Northern lake shore and is a yachting destination. It is also a location for fishing (carp being the most common catch) although the introduction of eels and other non-indigenous species has caused ecological damage in recent years.

Description
The town has two marinas, a string of carbonated mineral water springs, listed buildings from the middle of the 18th and the 19th centuries and fine restaurants. It has modern hotels and guest-houses to accommodate about fifty thousand visitors in the summer. The nearest villages around Balatonfüred are Tihany, Aszófő, Balatonszőlős and Csopak, all renowned for their wine, land and beaches. Highway No 71 crosses the town as well as a single track railway line between Budapest and Tapolca. Although a shipyard was once the town's largest employer, now that place has been taken by the State Hospital for Cardiology. The largest industry is catering and providing boarding and other accommodations. The town has a pier, a harbour, a large camping site and several private marinas.

Visitors come for the mild micro-climate, scenery, the local wine, made of Olaszrizling grapes, and sailing and swimming facilities, as well as to revive the two-century-old tradition of socializing around spas, bathing and vacationing. The main events of the two-month-long summer holiday season include a ball for first-time visitors with a beauty contest and a wine-tasting festival, both in August.

Füred (short for Balatonfüred) has six comprehensive schools, three grammar schools, a secondary modern school for viniculture, the Lajos Loczy High School and Janos Ferencsik Music School (conservatory). A number of choirs, bands and sporting clubs are also present. The town has a local TV studio and a monthly newspaper. Füred has a newly built conference and sport centre as well.

There are three churches in the town: a typical red-sandstone Catholic church, a white Protestant church and a modern Evangelist church. A Pentecostal, American type of Christian denomination Faith Church is also active in the former Communist party headquarters.

Balatonfüred has a number of conference halls and a large clinic for heart patients. It also has a number of wine cellars that sell white house wine from the vineyards on the hillside overlooking the town and the lake.

In winter, the lake may freeze over for weeks so that skaters and ice boaters take over near the shore of the town.

State Hospital for Cardiology
With its 429 beds the State Hospital for Cardiology in Balatonfüred boasts the largest cardiac-rehabilitation center in Hungary. The hospital is built on the lake shore and is flanked by the Tagore promenade, named after the Nobel-laureate Indian poet Rabindranath Tagore, who was treated here. Many other patients come here to heal and recuperate year-round thanks to the carbonated springs and baths, which are one of the best-known healing agents in Balatonfüred since the 17th century. The town was officially declared a spa in 1772. The Kossuth Spring and other springs near the hospital supply water containing free and bound carbon dioxide as well as iron, magnesium, potassium, hydrocarbonate, calcium, sodium, sulfur and other minerals. The temperature of the spring waters is  they are collected into a large basin and conducted to the spa building.

Sights
 A well named after Lajos Kossuth with carbonated drinking water – see gallery below 

 Former classicist holiday home of actress Lujza Blaha (1816)

 The resort house of Mór Jókai
 A cave named after geologist Lajos Lóczy
 Tagore promenade
 Sundance Park, set on the site of the former Greek Quarter, houses many clubs, bars and restaurants.

Twin towns – sister cities

Balatonfüred is twinned with:
 Kouvola, Finland (1988)
 Germering, Germany (1989)
 Opatija, Croatia (1996)
 Covasna, Romania (2003)
 Arpino, Italy (2006)

Notable people
József Manes Österreicher (1759–1831), physician
Elek Straub (1944–), engineer, businessman and manager
Bendegúz Bóka (1993–), handballer
Gábor Bodó (1941–2011), volleyball player
János Vörös (1891–1968), military officer, politician, Minister of Defence
Pál Jávor (1902–1959), actor
Sava Babić (1934–2012), Serbian writer, poet, translator and university professor
Mór Jókai (1825–1904), dramatist and novelist
Zoltán Horváth (1937–), sabre fencer
Rózsa Hoffmann (1948–), politician and educator
Dániel Berzsenyi (1776–1836), poet
Áron Gádorfalvi (1976–), windsurfer
Diána Detre (1983–), windsurfer
Sándor Kisfaludy (1772–1844), lyric poet
Rabindranath Tagore (1861–1941), Bengali polymath
László Passuth (1900–1979), author of historical novels and translator
Kolos Ferenc Vaszary (1832–1915), cardinal of the Roman Catholic Church
Protiwinsky Ferenc (1884–1947), akadémikus festő

Gallery

Sport
The 2008 Central Europe Rally, which legally served as the 2008 Dakar Rally when the Amaury Sport Organisation cancelled the Lisbon-Dakar race in December 2007 over terrorist attacks, finished in Balatonfüred.

Balatonfüredi FC, association football team
Balatonfüredi KSE, handball team

References

External links 

  in Hungarian and English
 Balatonfüred town Web site – in English
 State Hospital for Cardiology in Balatonfüred (in English)
 Tourism + Pictures + sights about Balatonfüred 
 Annagora Water Park
 Balatonfüred at funiq.hu

Populated places in Veszprém County